The shaggy frogfish (Antennarius hispidus), is a  marine fish in the family Antennariidae.

Description
Like other members of its family, it has a globulous, extensible body, and its soft skin is covered with small dermal spinules. The skin can also be adorned, but not systematically, with cutaneous appendages reminding one of hairs. Its large mouth is prognathous and allows it to gobble up prey as large as itself. The coloring of their bodies is extremely variable because they always tend to match their living environments.
Frogfishes have the capacity to change coloration and pigment pattern in few weeks. However, the dominant coloration goes from yellow to brownish-orange, passing through a whole range of related nuances. Their bodies and fins can be endowed with roughly parallel, dark stripes, some radiating outward from the eye. The belly is free from stripes.

The first dorsal spine, called illicium, is modified and is used as a fishing lure. Its extremity is endowed with a characteristic oval esca composed of a multitude of slender filaments in a tuft. This lure is a way to separate easily A. hispidus from Antennarius striatus, which presents similar physical characteristics (stripes, coloration, cutaneous appendages) and with which it is often confused. The illicium has the same length as the second dorsal spine. The second dorsal spine is practically straight and is mobile, and the third one is bent towards the back of the body. They are well separated from each other and also from the dorsal fin.

The pectoral fins are angled and help, with the pelvic fins, to move the frogfish on the bottom and to keep a stable position for ambush.

Distribution
Shaggy frogfish are found in tropical coastal waters from Indian Ocean and in the center of the Indo-Pacific area, but are absent from oceanic islands.

Habitat
This species inhabits shallow rocky and coral reefs to deep muddy habitats. It can be found from the surface to 90 m deep with average occurrences at 45 m.

Feeding
As all frogfishes, A. hispidus is a voracious carnivore which gulps down all the prey which pass in its strike area, mainly fish, but even some congeners. Its prey range in size up to close to its own size.

Behaviour
Like other members of its family, it has a benthic and solitary lifestyle. They gather during mating period. but do not tolerate each other any more after the act of fertilization. The male can kill or eat the female if she stays close.

References

External links
http://www.frogfish.ch/species-arten/Antennarius-hispidus.html
http://www.fishbase.org/summary/Antennarius-hispidus.html
http://eol.org/pages/216694/details
http://www.marinespecies.org/aphia.php?p=taxdetails&id=217845
http://www.itis.gov/servlet/SingleRpt/SingleRpt?search_topic=TSN&search_value=164547

Antennariidae
Fish described in 1801